Newton Aycliffe Football Club is an English football club based in Newton Aycliffe, County Durham. The club's ground is the Moore Lane Sports Club Ground (currently named the Securicorp Stadium for sponsorship reasons). They play in the Northern League division one.

History
The club joined the Wearside League in 1984–85 and spent just under a decade in that league, their best finish being in 1988–89 when they finished in seventh place. They folded in March of the 1993–94 season after picking up two points from their opening 20 games. The team competed in the FA Vase in every season, their best run being in 1991–92 when they got to the third round. The club reformed and played in local football before joining the Durham Alliance. They won that league in 2007–08 and joined the Wearside League. The club was elected into the Northern League for the 2009–10 season, after finishing first in their previous season in the Wearside Football League. Finishing in ninth place in their first season in the second division of the Northern League, they went on to become the Champions of the division with three games remaining. Having anticipated the possibility months before, the team were required to make more improvements to the home ground to be eligible to play in the First Division of the Northern League. Upon ensuring their place in the top division, they finished in ninth place and participated in the FA Cup for the first time.

Honours
Durham Challenge Cup
Winners 2015–16
Durham Alliance
Champions 2007–08
Wearside League
Champions 2008–09
Northern League Division Two
Champions 2010–11

Records
FA Cup
2nd Round Qualifying 2015-16
FA Vase
Third Round 1991–92

References

External links
Official website
Northern League website

 
Football clubs in England
Association football clubs established in 1965
Football clubs in County Durham
1965 establishments in England
Wearside Football League
Northern Football League
Newton Aycliffe